Chukwuemeka Kingsley Jonathan (born April 28, 1998) is an American football defensive end for the Buffalo Bills of the National Football League (NFL). He was also the number one overall pick in the 2022 CFL Global Draft.

Early life and education
Jonathan was born on April 28, 1998, in Lagos, Nigeria. He grew up in Baltimore, Maryland, and attended Saint Frances Academy. He also attended Eastern Alamance High School. He played defensive end and linebacker and also participated in basketball, soccer, and track and field. As a senior with Saint Frances, he recorded 65 tackles and 16 sacks, leading his team to a 10–2 record and the MIAA Class A championship. Jonathan was ranked the 24th-best defensive end by Rivals.com and was the 29th weakside defensive end according to 247Sports.

Jonathan committed to Syracuse University and made his college football debut in 2017 against Central Connecticut. Overall, as a freshman, he appeared in eight games and made four tackles. Jonathan appeared in all 13 games in his sophomore year, 2018, and started two. He recorded 21 tackles and placed third on the team with five sacks. He was an ACC honor roll selection.

Jonathan played as a reserve defensive end in 2019 and made 12 appearances. He recorded 24 tackles, three for-loss, and 1.5 sacks, earning All-ACC Academic honors. In his senior year, 2020, Jonathan was awarded the Jim Tatum Award for best ACC student-athlete. He started all 11 games and finished the year with 32 total tackles, three sacks and a forced fumble. He was a Campbell Trophy semifinalist, Wuerffel Trophy watchlisted player, Senior CLASS Award candidate and was a semifinalist for the Jason Witten Collegiate Man of the Year Award.

Jonathan was given an extra year of eligibility in 2021, and decided to return to the Syracuse program as a fifth-year senior. He appeared in all 12 games and started one, making 20 tackles and 4.5 sacks. He was a semifinalist for the Campbell Trophy, Witten Award and was a watchlisted player for the Wuerffel Trophy. He won the Joseph Alexander Award for "excellence in football, scholarship, and citizenship."

Jonathan finished his college career with 101 tackles (60 solo), 21.5 for-loss, 15 quarterback sacks, two fumble recoveries and three forced fumbles in a total of 56 games.

Professional career

Buffalo Bills
After going unselected in the 2022 NFL Draft, Jonathan was signed by the Buffalo Bills as an undrafted free agent. He was also the top pick in the 2022 CFL Global Draft, being selected by the Montreal Alouettes, but chose to stay with Buffalo. He was released at the final roster cuts on August 30, 2022.

Chicago Bears
Jonathan was claimed off waivers by the Chicago Bears on September 1, 2022. He was waived on November 15, after having recorded four tackles in five games.

Buffalo Bills (second stint)
On November 17, 2022, Jonathan was signed to the Buffalo Bills practice squad. He signed a reserve/future contract on January 23, 2023.

References

External links
 Chicago Bears bio
 Syracuse Orange bio

1998 births
Living people
Nigerian players of American football
American football defensive ends
Syracuse Orange football players
Buffalo Bills players
Chicago Bears players